"Hi, canny man hoy a ha'penny oot" is a famous Geordie folk song written in the 19th century by Harry Nelson, in a style deriving from music hall. Nelson was a well-known Geordie singer/comedian in the late 19th/early 20th century and is credited with writing the song.

Lyrics 

The song is based on the old Geordie tradition, which was still a common occurrence in the 1950s, and still (very occasionally) takes place today. As the bride and groom were leaving the church, they would throw coppers to the boys and girls gathered around outside. This would be to calls from the youngsters of "Hoy oot" or similar. These words were eventually written into the song  – as "Hi, canny man hoy a ha'penny  oot, Ye'll see some fun thor is ne doot, Where ivvor Aa gan ye'll heor them shoot, Hi, canny man, hoy a ha'penny oot."

Comments on variations to the above version 

In the early 19th century, as today, there were cheap books and magazines.

Many of these "chapbooks" were on poor quality paper to a poor standard and with poor quality print. The works were copied with no thoughts of copyright, and the work required very little proof-reading, and what was done was not required to a high standard. Consequently, the dialect words of songs varied between editions.

This particular song shows several variations between the various published versions, some very minor, mainly in the spelling of the words, and sometimes variations within the same edition. Some of the most common are listed below:

Generally

Discography 

The same artist also recorded "Our Jennie", both later in his career, and both have survived and are available on the CD  "Various Artists - Wor Nanny's A Mazer: Early Recordings Of Artists From The North East 1904-1933" (on Phonograph, PHCD2K1) 
The full list of tracks on this CD are as follows:

See also 
Geordie dialect words

Recordings
  Harry Nelson – sings "Hi, Canny Man" on the CD -

References

External links
 Sources for Newcastle Music

English folk songs
Songs related to Newcastle upon Tyne
1862 songs
Northumbrian folklore